The Central Province is one of the provinces of Solomon Islands, covering the Russell Islands, Nggela Islands (Florida Islands) and Savo Island. Its area comprises  and had a population of 26,051 , rising to 30,326 . The provincial capital is Tulagi.

Administrative divisions
Central Province is sub-divided into the following wards (with populations at the 2009 Census):

 Central Province (26,051)
Sandfly/Buenavista (3,226)
West Gela (2,220)
East Gela (2,026)
Tulagi (1,251)
South West Gela (2,586)
South East Gela (1,662)
North East Gela (2,118)
North West Gela (1,722)
Banika (2,019)
Pavuvu (1,956)
Lovukol (2,128)
North Savo (1,520)
South Savo (1,617)

Islands and settlements
Aeaun
Mbanika - Yandina
Nggela Islands
Russell Islands
Savo - Kusini, Reko
Tulagi - Tulagi

References

Provinces of the Solomon Islands
 
States and territories established in 1981